Old Scona Academic School, often referred to as Old Scona or OSA, is a high school located in the Old Strathcona district of Edmonton, Alberta. It is a small academic high school with a population of approximately 340 to 360 students. The school's stated purpose is to provide academically inclined students an opportunity to grow in an environment of intellectual stimulation, and is recognized as one of the top academic high schools in Canada. The school's motto is, "Ever to Excel".

History 

The building housing Old Scona Academic was opened in 1908 as Strathcona Collegiate Institute. Originally part of the City of Strathcona school system, Strathcona Collegiate Institute transferred to the Edmonton system when Strathcona amalgamated with Edmonton in 1912.  University of Alberta classes were held on the upper floors from 1909 to 1911. In 1912, the name of the school was changed to Strathcona High School. Strathcona High School closed in 1958, following the opening of Strathcona Composite High School in 1955 and of Bonnie Doon High School in 1958. 

Following the closure of the high school the building was used as Strathcona Junior High School (Until the mid-1960s). It later saw use for continuing education, special education, and as an annex for MacEwan University when that institution was founded in 1971. In 1976, the Board of Trustees of Edmonton Public Schools opened Old Scona Academic High School, an academic alternative high school in the original Strathcona Collegiate Institute building. Since June 1980, Old Scona Academic has been an International Baccalaureate World School.

COVID-19 pandemic
Being a school of only ~360 students, Old Scona Academic had only 2 periods of distance learning during the worldwide pandemic of SARS-CoV-2 from 2019-2021, even with the highest attendance rate in the Edmonton Public Schools Board district (92%) for senior high schools, compared to a districtwide average of 72% attendance rates across all schools. There was no person-to-person transmission of the virus at OSA detected by Alberta Health Services.

Reputation and results 

Old Scona Academic has been recognized as one of the best high schools in Canada; Maclean's Magazine named OSA as the top academic high school in Canada.  In addition to its Maclean's ranking, OSA has consistently been ranked by the Fraser Institute as the best high school in Alberta.  In 2011, it was featured as the top-ranked high school in the Edmonton Sun's High School Report Card. The school is consistently the top performing Edmonton High school in school marks and provincial diploma exams.

Admission 

The 120 students who enter OSA each year are chosen on the basis of set criteria from an excess of applicants. Prospective students are evaluated using a standardized admission exam, in addition to grade 9 marks and a character assessment from a Junior High counselor or principal.

Programs of study 

Old Scona Academic offers the International Baccalaureate (I.B.) Diploma Program in addition to fulfilling the Alberta Education Curriculum. Students begin grade ten enrolled in a pre-I.B. program. During the spring term of this year, students must elect to either pursue the full I.B. program, a partial I.B. program, or the basic Alberta Education Curriculum. Most OSA students enroll in partial I.B., with approximately ten to twenty students a year opting for the full I.B. program.

The Old Scona Academic Higher Level (HL) I.B. course offerings as of 2021 are English A Language and Literature, European History (Route 2: Peacekeeping), Biology, and Physics. Mathematics, Chemistry, Computer Science, French B, and Group 6 arts are offered only at the Standard Level (SL). Most courses are also offered as regular Alberta 20 and 30 level classes, for those students only taking the basic Alberta Education Curriculum or partial I.B. program.

Students who elect to undertake the full two-year I.B. program to receive an I.B. Diploma, must complete all six groups of courses, as per the International Baccalaureate (I.B.) Diploma Program. This includes:

 Group 1: English
 Group 2: Second Language (French)
 Group 3: Individuals and Societies (History)
 Group 4: Experimental Sciences (Chemistry, Biology, or Physics)
 Group 5: Mathematics and Computer Science
 and Group 6: Arts.

At least three of these groups must be completed at Higher Level (HL). In addition to these classes, I.B. program students must take the Theory of Knowledge (TOK) course, complete an extended essay, and must document a number of extra-curricular and community involvement hours known as CAS (Creativity, Action, Service) hours. Unlike other Canadian provinces, Alberta does not allow completion of the I.B. Diploma program to be used in lieu of the provincial diploma. As a result, on top of their I.B. course load, full I.B. program students must fulfill the requirements of the Alberta Education Curriculum that do not get covered by the I.B. program, such as the Career and Life Management (CALM) course, physical education, and ten credit 30-level course requirements. Additionally, many post-secondary institutions (particularly those in Alberta) will not solely use the I.B. program for acceptance (though it does provide benefits). Many, for example, require completion of Chemistry, Biology, and Physics at the 30-level. As the I.B. program only requires one of these courses for Group 4, students must take the remaining two outside of the I.B. program. These combined requirements often lead to lengthy course loads and extended class hours / homework.

As a result of these demands, most students at Old Scona Academic choose to pursue a partial I.B. program. While this does not grant the student any I.B. Diploma status, there are benefits to completing many 30-level classes in I.B. Higher Level (HL). Many post-secondary institutions will view completion of these higher level classes (with good marks), as equivalent to completing comparative introductory classes in the post-secondary level. Therefore, students can use partial I.B. to get credit for many introductory post-secondary classes like Biology and English, saving both time and tuition later on.

Because OSA is a small school, it has a limited selection of elective classes. These include choral music, instrumental music, jazz band, performing arts, drama, speech and debate, leadership, art, theory of knowledge (which can be taken without the full IB diploma), computer applications, computer programming, and cyber security. These options vary every year, depending on student body interest and staffing logistics. Physical education at the 20 and 30 levels is not required by the Alberta Education Curriculum, but is offered as an elective for students. In the past, many students have also taken second languages such as German and Japanese through external programs affiliated with Alberta Education.

Building 

Designed by local architect Roland Lines, the cornerstone of the building was laid by the first premier (and education minister) of Alberta, Alexander Rutherford in 1907, the same year Strathcona became a city.  The school was officially opened by Lieutenant-Governor George Bulyea on 17 February 1909.  It was one of the largest and most up-to-date school buildings in the province at the time, featuring an advanced automatic climate control system.  The style is described as Edwardian Classical Free, which retains some decorative features of the Victorian era but is more subdued, practical, and utilitarian, and less traditional.

The building has received a number of renovations since its opening. The most recent major renovation and restoration took place in 1997. Since then, smaller restoration projects like new flooring have taken place. Modernization of the school to include computer labs, a Wi-Fi network and LCD projectors in classrooms have been careful to maintain the historical integrity of the building. Some elements, such as the external fire escapes, remain part of the building for historical integrity, but are no longer in use due to structural age. Many of the building's mechanical systems, although today out-of-date and replaced for efficiency and safety reasons, were highly advanced when the building was constructed. Many elements have been left by renovations for decorative effect, are on display in the school, or have been stored in the Provincial Archives of Alberta.

In September 2008, in recognition of the academic history of the various institutions that have used the building over the years and the architectural significance of the building, the school was designated a provincial historic resource.  This designation limits the modifications and additions that can be performed on the building.

Notable alumni 
Clarence Campbell, Third President of the National Hockey League, Rhodes Scholar
Chrystia Freeland, Rhodes Scholar, Journalist, Canadian Deputy Prime Minister.
Garnett Genuis, MP for Sherwood Park—Fort Saskatchewan.
Lois Hole, 15th Lieutenant Governor of Alberta
Heather McPherson (politician), MP for Edmonton Strathcona.
Ray Muzyka, co-founder of BioWare
William Smith Ziegler, brigadier in the Second World War.

External links 
School website: https://oldscona.epsb.ca/

References 

High schools in Edmonton
International Baccalaureate schools in Alberta
Educational institutions established in 1976
Provincial Historic Resources in Edmonton
1976 establishments in Alberta